

The Wesley Building, also known as the Robert Morris Hotel, is a historic office building and hotel located at 1701-09 Arch Street at the corner of N. 17th Street in the Logan Square neighborhood of Philadelphia, Pennsylvania. The original 6-story section was built in 1914–15, with an 8-story addition in 1921–22; the cornice of the original building can still be seen above the sixth floor.

The building was commissioned by the Board of Home Missions of the United Methodist Church as offices and a hotel for the Methodist Church. It was designed by Ballinger & Perot in the Gothic Revival style and features intricate terra cotta detailing. Located directly across Arch Street from the 58-story Comcast Center, the tallest building in Pennsylvania, the now century old structure was converted in 2012 to a 111-unit rental apartment building called "The Arch Luxury Apartments".

The Wesley Building was added to the National Register of Historic Places in 1984.

Gallery

See also

National Register of Historic Places listings in Center City, Philadelphia

References
Notes

External links

Properties of religious function on the National Register of Historic Places in Philadelphia
Hotel buildings on the National Register of Historic Places in Philadelphia
Gothic Revival architecture in Pennsylvania
Commercial buildings completed in 1922
Logan Square, Philadelphia
Residential skyscrapers in Philadelphia
1915 establishments in Pennsylvania